The Arizona State Sun Devils college football team represents Arizona State University in the Pacific 12 Conference (Pac-12). The Sun Devils compete as part of the NCAA Division I Football Bowl Subdivision. The program has had 24 head coaches and two interim head coaches since it began play during the 1897 season. Since November 2022, Kenny Dillingham has served as head coach at Arizona State.

Ten coaches have led Arizona State in postseason bowl games: Dixie Howell, Ed Doherty, Frank Kush, Darryl Rogers, John Cooper, Bruce Snyder, Dirk Koetter, Dennis Erickson, Todd Graham, and Herm Edwards. Seven of those coaches also won conference championships: Ted Shipkey, Clyde B. Smith, and Dan Devine each captured one and Kush two as a member of the Border Conference; Kush captured seven as a member of the Western Athletic Conference; and Cooper and Snyder each captured one as a member of the Pacific-10.

Kush is the leader in seasons coached and games won, with 176 victories during his 22 years with the program. Devine has the highest winning percentage at 	0.887. George E. Cooper has the lowest winning percentage of those who have coached more than one game, with 0.000. Of the 24 different head coaches who have led the Cougars, Howell, Devine, Kush, Cooper, and Erickson have been inducted into the College Football Hall of Fame.

Key

Coaches

Notes

References

Arizona State

Arizona State Sun Devils football